Thomas Frühwirth (born 12 August 1981) is an Austrian Para-cyclist who represented Austria at the Paralympic Games.

Early life
Thomas Frühwirth was born on a farm in southeast Styria, Austria. He has three brothers. At the age of 15 he started Enduro sports. He completed an apprenticeship as a car mechanic and car electrician, worked in development at Steyr Daimler Puch and later at the motorcycle manufacturer KTM AG. In 2004 he had a motorcycle accident while on vacation in Poland. The result was incomplete paraplegia.

Career
Frühwirth represented Austria in the men's road time trial H4 and road race H4 events at the 2016 Summer Paralympics and won a silver medal in time trial. He again represented Austria in the men's road time trial H4 and  road race H4 events at the 2020 Summer Paralympics and won two silver medals.

Thomas Frühwirth owns the course record in the division Handcycling at the Ironman Hawaii in 8h 15' 39" (Ironman World Championship 2022).

Sports achievements

Achievements in Para-Cycling

Achievements in Para-Triathlon
The table shows the most significant results (podium) obtained in paratriathlon competitions since 2010.

References

Living people
1981 births
Austrian male cyclists
Cyclists at the 2016 Summer Paralympics
Cyclists at the 2020 Summer Paralympics
Medalists at the 2016 Summer Paralympics
Medalists at the 2020 Summer Paralympics
Paralympic medalists in cycling
Paralympic silver medalists for Austria
Sportspeople from Graz
20th-century Austrian people
21st-century Austrian people